Nancy Storrs (born March 24, 1950) is an American rower. She competed in the women's coxed four event at the 1976 Summer Olympics.

References

External links
 

1950 births
Living people
American female rowers
Olympic rowers of the United States
Rowers at the 1976 Summer Olympics
People from Huntington, New York
21st-century American women
World Rowing Championships medalists for the United States